HMCS Saguenay was a River-class destroyer that served in the Royal Canadian Navy (RCN) from 1931 to 1945.

She was similar to the Royal Navy's  and initially wore the pennant D79, changed in 1940 to I79.

History
She was built by John I. Thornycroft & Company at Woolston, Hampshire and commissioned into the RCN on 21 May 1931 at Portsmouth, England. Saguenay  and her sister  were the first ships specifically built for the RCN.  Her first two commanding officers went on to become two of the most important Admirals of the Battle of the Atlantic. She arrived in Halifax, on 3 July 1931.

Second World War
For the first month of Second World War, Saguenay was assigned to convoy duties in the Halifax area. In late September 1939, she was assigned to the American and West Indies Squadron based at Kingston, Jamaica.

On 23 October 1939, the German-flagged tanker Emmy Friederich scuttled herself on encountering Saguenay in the Yucatán Channel, and thus became the Canadian destroyer's first war conquest. In December 1939, Saguenay returned to Halifax to join the local convoy escort force, with which she remained until 16 October 1940, when she was transferred to Greenock, Scotland to serve as a convoy escort on the North Atlantic run.

After repairs at Greenock, she returned to sea on 22 May 1941. Saguenay was assigned to Escort Group C-3 escorting convoys ON-93, HX-191, ONS-104, SC-90, ON-115, HX-202, ON-121, SC-98, ON-131, HX-210 and ON-141 prior to a collision while escorting SC-109.  On 15 November 1942, Saguenay was rammed by the Panamanian freighter Azra off Cape Race, Newfoundland. The impact of the collision set off Saguenays depth charges, which blew off her stern.

She made port at Saint John, New Brunswick, where her stern was plated over. On 23 May 1943, Saguenay was transferred to Halifax, to serve with the Western Ocean Escort Force working from Halifax and St. John's, Newfoundland. She was used for teaching seamanship and gunnery until 30 July 1945, paid off in late 1945, and broken up in 1946.

Commanding officers
 Cdr. P.W. Nelles, RCN (22 May 1931—6 June 1932)
 Cdr. L.W. Murray, RCN (7 June 1932—22 May 1934)
 Cdr. R.I. Agnew, RCN (22 May 1934—5 May 1936)
 Cdr. W.J.R. Beech, RCN (6 May 1936—29 June 1938)
 LCdr. F.L. Houghton, RCN (30 June 1938—7 July 1939)
 LCdr. G.L. Miles, RCN (8 July 1939—21 April 1941)
 Lt. P.E. Haddon, RCN (22 April 1941—7 April 1942)
 A/(Acting) Cdr. D.C. Wallace, RCNR (8 April 1942—14 January 1943)
 Lt. J.W. McDowall, RCN (15 January 1943—11 March 1943)
 Lt. J.H. Ewart, RCNVR (24 August 1943—17 May 1944)
 Lt. W.C. Hawkins, RCNVR (18 May 1944—6 October 1944)
 A/Lt. W.E. Hughson, RCNVR (7 October 1944—15 April 1945)
 Lt. K.P. Blanche, RCNVR (16 April 1945—30 July 1945)

Convoys escorted

Trans-Atlantic convoys escorted

Notes

References
 
 
 
 Macpherson, Keneth R. and Burgess, John. (1982)(Second Printing) The Ships of Canada's Naval Forces 1910–1981. Collins Publishers.

External links

 Convoy Web: The Website for Merchant Ships during WW2
 warsailors.com

Canadian River-class destroyers
Canadian River-class destroyers converted from A-class destroyers (1929)
Ships built in Southampton
1930 ships
World War II destroyers of Canada
Maritime incidents in December 1940
Maritime incidents in November 1942
Ships built by John I. Thornycroft & Company